Coiled-coil domain-containing protein 144A is a protein that in humans is encoded by the CCDC144A gene. An alias of this gene is called KIAA0565. There are four members of the CCDC family: CCDC 144A, 144B, 144C and putative CCDC 144 N-terminal like proteins.

Gene 

This gene has a nucleotide sequence that is 5140 bp long, and it encodes 641 amino acids.  It is found on the short arm, plus (forward) strand of chromosome 17 at p11.2.  The mRNA for the CCDC144A gene has 3 alternative splicing isoforms named A2RUR9-1, A2RUR9-2, AND A2RUR9-3, but there is no experimental confirmation available yet.

Protein 

This protein for this gene is also known as coiled coil domain containing 144A (CCDC144A) protein. It consists of 641 amino acids.   This protein weighs 75.8 kDa and has an isoelectric point of 6.357. This protein localizes near the nucleus, and is a soluble protein with a hydrophobicity of -1.021842. This protein is also non-secretory and has 10 potential serine and 3 potential threonine phosphorylation sites. There are no tyrosine sulfation sites, but there are a few potential sumoylation sites on this protein. Also, this protein is predicted to be non-myristoylated and does not contain a signal peptide.

Structure

This protein has a domain of unknown function (DUF) 3496, which has been conserved in eukaryotes.  The DUF3496 domain is found from amino acids 547-622.
CCDC144A, an alias of this gene, indicates that there should be a coiled coil domain within the protein. Coiled coils are structural motifs in proteins in which 2 more alpha helices are coiled together, and they usually contain a heptad repeat, hxxhcxc, or hydrophobic (h) and charge (c) amino acid residues. The 5' and 3' untranslated regions of the nucleotide sequence of this gene are rich in stem-loop structures. In place of a coiled coil, a leucine zipper was found. Residues from 478-499, "LHNTRDALGRESLILERVQRDL", are the residues that form the leucine zipper pattern. The structure of this protein consists of mostly alpha helices, with some random coils.

Evolution 

Orthologs of KIAA0565 protein have been identified mostly in mammals, but some birds, reptiles, amphibians, and fish as well.

Potential Orthologs

Clinical significance 

This gene has been linked to Smith-Magenis Syndrome (SMS), which is also known as chromosome 17p11.2 deletion syndrome, chromosome 17p deletion syndrome, deletion 17p syndrome, partial monosomy 17p, and deletion abnormality.

Interacting proteins 

There may potentially be two proteins that interact with KIAA0565, and they are ubiquitin specific peptidase 32 (USP32) and ubiquitin specific peptidase 25 (USP25).

Expression 

This protein has been shown to have relatively low expression in all tissues.

References

External links